Lal Qila is a station on the Violet Line of Delhi Metro system. This station serves the iconic Red Fort and the nearby Chandni Chowk in Delhi.

History

The station

Station layout

Facilities

Connections

Bus
Delhi Transport Corporation bus routes number 114ST+901, 214, 214CL, 261, 347, 348, 402CL, 403CL, 405, 405A, 405STL, 425, 429CL, 605, 729, 807A serves the station from Red Fort stop.

Entry/Exit

See also

Delhi
List of Delhi Metro stations
Transport in Delhi
Delhi Metro Rail Corporation
Delhi Suburban Railway
Delhi Monorail
Delhi Transport Corporation
Central Delhi
Old Delhi
Chandni Chowk
Red Fort
National Capital Region (India)
List of rapid transit systems
List of metro systems

References

External links

 Delhi Metro Rail Corporation Ltd. (Official site) 
 Delhi Metro Annual Reports
 
 UrbanRail.Net – descriptions of all metro systems in the world, each with a schematic map showing all stations.

Delhi Metro stations
Railway stations in New Delhi district
Railway stations in India opened in 2017